Morning Face is a novel by Mulk Raj Anand and was first published in 1968. The book won the Sahitya Akademi Award in 1971. The book features Anand's autobiographical narrative that was first used by him in Seven Summers. He delivers the story through a personalized telling of the late independence era politics and history. Anand himself considered the book to be on the structural lines of Raja Rao's The Serpent and the Rope, but separated by the values espoused.

Translations
This novel was translated into Telugu language by Revuri Anantha Padmanabha Rao entitled Prabhata Vadanam in 1992 and published by Sahitya Akademi, New Delhi.

References

Novels by Mulk Raj Anand
1968 novels
1968 Indian novels
Sahitya Akademi Award-winning works